The 1998 U.S. Pro Tennis Championships was a men's tennis tournament played on Hard courts in Boston, United States that was part of the International Series of the 1998 ATP Tour. It was the seventieth edition of the tournament and was held from 24 to 30 August 1998.

Seeds
Champion seeds are indicated in bold text while text in italics indicates the round in which those seeds were eliminated.

Draw

Finals

Top half

Bottom half

References

Singles
1998
1998 in American tennis